Sangita Rai (born 24 February 2000, Jhapa, Nepal) is a Nepalese cricketer who plays for Nepal women's national cricket team.

International career 
In October 2021, She was named in Nepal's side for the 2021 ICC Women's T20 World Cup Asia Qualifier tournament in the United Arab Emirates. On 16 November 2021, She made her T20I debut against Qatar in the Nepal women's tour of Qatar.

References

External links 
 

2000 births
Living people
Nepalese women cricketers
Nepal women Twenty20 International cricketers
People from Jhapa District